The Colne Valley Water Company was a statutory water company, formed in 1873. For a hundred years its water supply was obtained from underground sources accessed by boreholes. Pressure on these resources led to the Three Valleys Scheme and the construction of nine miles of trunk main from the River Thames was completed in 1974. In 1994, Colne Valley merged with the other two companies in the Scheme, the Rickmansworth and Lee Valley Water companies, to form Three Valleys Water plc. That in turn was acquired by Veolia Water in 1987.

History
In 1837, Robert Stephenson, while acting as the engineer on the London to Birmingham railway line, sank boreholes for water supply. In 1840, a committee of the House of Lords instructed him to carry out further investigations in the Bushey area, where there was no piped water. He established that a good supply could be provided in the Colne Valley area but it took another 30 years and a typhoid outbreak before anything was done. Eventually, an agreement was reached in December 1872 to form a water company, based on Stephenson's findings and a parliamentary bill was approved in June 1873. The estimated population to be served was a mere 7,000.

There was an initial reluctance by the public to subscribe due to the long-term nature of the investment but shares were eventually issued at par. Within five years of opening, Colne Valley Water was supplying 250,000 gallons a day to a population of under 9,000 although no dividends were paid until 1883. In 1885, Colne Valley made its first acquisition of a neighbouring undertaking – Harrow Waterworks. The Central Middlesex Water Co. was bought in 1894, taking the company into Wembley. By 1900, Colne Valley was supplying a population of 60,000 and the ensuing decades featured applications for new boreholes to service the steadily increasing population.

In 1927, a new bill was presented to Parliament for two additional pumping stations near St Albans. The bill was opposed by the Metropolitan Water Board and withdrawn by Colne Valley with the MWB agreeing to supply Colne with 5 million gallons a day. However, in return, Colne agreed that it would not seek approval for new wells within the watershed of the River Thames and its tributaries – in effect, forfeiting the right to develop water resources in its own area of supply. The restriction was described as "crippling" and it was 26 years before the agreement was terminated. Some incremental supply was obtained in 1935 when the Bushey Hall Gravel Company sank wells on its reserves, and in 1938 from the Grand Union Canal's Aldenham reservoir.

In 1941, Colne Valley decided that it need a reservoir for additional storage and a bill was introduced for the construction of the Hilfield Park Reservoir. As earlier, the bill was withdrawn in the face of opposition but was successfully reintroduced in 1945. Under the Colne Valley Water Act 1945, the Company began construction of the reservoir in 1951 and it was completed it in 1955. At the time, it was the only known reservoir to be built for storing water pumped from underground. In 1956, the government advocated the regrouping of water companies into larger units and the acquisition of two water companies followed - St Albans in 1959 and Harpenden in 1960. Later came the acquisition of two local authority water undertakings - St Albans RDC in 1962 and the much larger Watford Corporation in 1973.

It was recognised that the underground water resources could not be developed further and there would be a need to source water from the Thames. Colne promoted the Three Valleys Scheme in conjunction with the Rickmansworth & Uxbridge Valley and Lee Valley water companies. Thames Conservancy issued a licence for the extraction of 18 million gallons a day in 1973, to rise to 50 million gallons a day in 1985. Work began in 1972 on the construction of nine miles of trunk main from the Thames to Harrow on the Hill, completed in 1974.

In 1994, the three companies that had worked on the Scheme twenty years previous, the Colne Valley, the Rickmansworth and Lee Valley Water companies merged to form Three Valleys Water plc. That in turn was acquired by Veolia Water UK in 1987.

See also
 Colne Valley Waterworks railway
 River Colne, Hertfordshire

References

Former water companies of England
Companies based in Three Rivers District
Companies established in 1873